Comocritis heliconia is a moth in the family Xyloryctidae. It was described by Edward Meyrick in 1933. It is found on Java in Indonesia.

References

Comocritis
Taxa named by Edward Meyrick
Moths described in 1933